Salarha (before 2016: Çaykent) is a town (belde) in the Rize District, Rize Province, Turkey. Its population is 2,263 (2021). Unlike much of the mountainous Rize Province, it is in a relatively flat area.

History 
According to list of villages in Laz language book (2009), name of the village is Salarxa.

Geography

References

Towns in Turkey
Populated places in Rize District